Rômulo dos Santos de Souza (born 28 April 1995), simply known as Rômulo, is a Brazilian footballer who plays as a forward.

Club career
Born in Rio de Janeiro, Rômulo graduated with Avaí's youth setup. He made his professional debut on 18 November 2014, coming on as a second-half substitute in a 2–0 home win against Portuguesa for the Série B championship, also assisting Marquinhos in the first goal. He featured in one more match for the side, which achieved promotion to Série A.

Rômulo made his debut in the main category on 30 May 2015, replacing Anderson Lopes in a 2–1 away win against Coritiba. He scored his first goal in the division on 7 June, netting a last-minute winner in a 1–0 win at Goiás.

References

External links

1995 births
Living people
Footballers from Rio de Janeiro (city)
Brazilian footballers
Association football forwards
Campeonato Brasileiro Série A players
Campeonato Brasileiro Série B players
Avaí FC players
Al Dhafra FC players
Al-Ittihad Kalba SC players
Brazilian expatriate sportspeople in the United Arab Emirates
Expatriate footballers in the United Arab Emirates
UAE Pro League players